USS Fechteler (DE-157) was a  in service with the United States Navy from 1943 to 1944. She was sunk by the German submarine U-967 in the Atlantic Ocean on 5 May 1944.

History
The destroyer escort was named in honor of Augustus Fechteler, a rear admiral who served in the United States Navy during World War I. Fechteler was launched on 22 April 1943 at the Norfolk Naval Shipyard; sponsored by Miss Joan S. Fechteler, granddaughter of Rear Admiral Fechteler and commissioned 1 July 1943.

Between 8 September 1943 and 31 December, Fechteler made two voyages on the key convoy route New York – Netherlands West Indies – North Africa, escorting vulnerable tankers carrying fuel and other oil products essential to modern warfare.  After overhaul at New York City, she took part in experimental antisubmarine exercises in Narragansett Bay, from which she sailed on 28 February 1944 for the Azores and Derry, Northern Ireland.  Arriving on 6 March 1944, she joined the escort of a New York-bound convoy, reaching the United States on 22 March.

On 1 April 1944, Fechteler sailed from New York for Hampton Roads, Virginia, where she joined a convoy for Bizerte, arriving on 22 April after coming under heavy enemy air attack two days before.  Homeward-bound, Fechteler was torpedoed by  commanded by Albrecht Brandi on 5 May in the Western Mediterranean.  As the ship began to break in two and sink, it was abandoned.  Twenty-nine of the crew were killed and 26 wounded.  and other ships of the convoy rescued 186 survivors.

Awards
Fechteler received one battle star for World War II service.

References

External links 

 
 Norfolk Naval Shipyard – Fechteler

Buckley-class destroyer escorts
World War II frigates and destroyer escorts of the United States
1943 ships
Ships sunk by German submarines in World War II
World War II shipwrecks in the Mediterranean Sea
Ships built in Portsmouth, Virginia
Maritime incidents in May 1944